Antônio Lopes dos Santos Júnior (born 22 November 1973), known as Júnior Lopes, is a Brazilian football coach. He is the current head coach of Camboriú.

Career
Born in Rio de Janeiro, Lopes began his career with Botafogo, being an assistant of the club's youth setup, in 1996. In 1998, he moved to cross-town rivals Vasco da Gama, under the same role.

In 2000 Lopes and his father joined the Brazil national team, with him being appointed assistant of the under-17s. He had his first managerial position with Bangu in 2002, after previously being the club's assistant and youth coach.

After another spell at Vasco, Lopes was appointed Olaria manager in 2004. Only months later he moved to Coritiba, becoming his father's assistant. After the latter's dismissal he was named interim manager, but was sacked on 27 October 2005.

After another spells as an assistant at Fluminense, Goiás, Asteras Tripoli and Atlético Paranaense, Lopes was named Iraty manager in 2008. On 31 May 2008, however, he was appointed at the helm of CSA.

After another assistant roles at Palmeiras, Atlético Paranaense and Avaí, Lopes was appointed as Vanderlei Luxemburgo's second at Flamengo. On 28 January 2013, after a spell at Grêmio, he was named Duque de Caxias manager.

Lopes resigned on 22 February, after altercations with the board, and joined Luxemburgo's staff at Fluminense. On 12 February 2014 he was appointed manager of Audax Rio. After failing to avoid relegation he left the club, and was named at the helm of Macaé on 6 April.

On 25 November 2014 Lopes was appointed at Tombense. After taking the club to the semifinals of Campeonato Mineiro, he was named the new manager of Portuguesa on 21 April 2015.

Personal life
Lopes' father, Antônio Lopes, is also a football manager.

References

External links
 
Soccerway profile
Flapédia profile 

1973 births
Living people
Sportspeople from Rio de Janeiro (city)
Brazilian football managers
Bangu Atlético Clube managers
Olaria Atlético Clube managers
Coritiba Foot Ball Club managers
Iraty Sport Club managers
Centro Sportivo Alagoano managers
Duque de Caxias Futebol Clube managers
Audax Rio de Janeiro Esporte Clube managers
Macaé Esporte Futebol Clube managers
Tombense Futebol Clube managers
Associação Portuguesa de Desportos managers
Tupi Football Club managers
Associação Desportiva Cabofriense managers
Itumbiara Esporte Clube managers
Camboriú Futebol Clube managers